Perspectives on Cinema of Assam is a book on the history of cinema of Assam, edited by Manoj Borpujari and Dr Garima Kalita. The book was published by Gauhati Cine Club in 2008. The book has a number of articles written by well-known authors who have traced the evolution of cinema in Assam from its birth to the contemporary stage including Documentary and the growth of the film industry. There is also an exclusive article on the Film Society Movement in Assam with a documentation of the entire list of films made in Assam from 1935 to 2007.

References

2008 non-fiction books
Indian books
Assamese literature
Books from Assam